Nichole is a feminine given name. Notable people with this name include:

 Nichole de Carle (born 1984), British fashion designer best known for her lingerie and swimwear brand 
 Nichole Cheza (born 1987), American motorcycle racer
 Nichole Denby (born 1982), US-born Nigerian track and field athlete
 Nichole Hiltz (born 1978), American actress
 Nichole Mead (born 1988), American beauty pageant titleholder
 Nichole Millage (born 1977), American Paralympic volleyball player
 Nichole Nordeman (born 1972), American Christian singer–songwriter
 Nichole Sakura (born 1989), American actress and model

See also 
 Nicole (disambiguation)

Feminine given names